Carlos Gustave Spaht, I (August 2, 1906 – April 29, 2001), was a Louisiana judge best remembered for having lost the Democratic gubernatorial runoff election in January 1952 to fellow Judge Robert F. Kennon of Minden, the seat of Webster Parish in northwestern Louisiana. Spaht's unsuccessful running mate for lieutenant governor was future Governor John J. McKeithen of Columbia, the seat of Caldwell Parish in north Louisiana. McKeithen lost to then State Senator C.E. "Cap" Barham of Ruston, the seat of Lincoln Parish, also in north Louisiana. At the time, McKeithen was an outgoing member of the Louisiana House of Representatives.

Spaht was affiliated for years with the Baton Rouge law firm Kantrow, Spaht, Weaver & Blitzer.

Early years

Born to Gustave Beauregard Spaht and the former Flora Elizabeth Holden, Spaht was reared on a dairy farm in Gentry County in northwestern Missouri. The family moved to Louisiana in the middle 1920s.  Spaht graduated from Louisiana State University in Baton Rouge, at which he joined the Reserve Officers' Training Corps and graduated second in his class and was the student body president. In 1931, he received his law degree from the Louisiana State University Law Center.

He served in the United States Army during World War II, having eventually earned the rank of colonel. He went on active duty in the summer of 1941 and was sent to China to work with the 8th Chinese Army. He became involved in the battle to free the Burma Road and was a commander under General Joseph Stilwell. He also met Lieutenant General Claire Lee Chennault of the Flying Tigers, who grew up near Ferriday, Louisiana.  At the Battle of Mount Song, Spadt, Peter S. Hopkins, and John C. Young were instrumental in planning and designing the explosive charges that destroyed that enemy stronghold.

After his military service, Spaht was elected district attorney of East Baton Rouge Parish. He was later appointed a judge for the 19th Judicial District but resigned in order to run for governor in the 1951–1952 election cycle.

Gubernatorial campaign

Spaht was urged to run for governor to succeed the then term-limited Earl Kemp Long. In the runoff election, anti-Long elements, including the third- and fourth-placed primary candidates, Hale Boggs and James M. McLemore coalesced behind Kennon. Even Bill Dodd, the outgoing lieutenant governor who fared poorly in the gubernatorial primary, endorsed Kennon, much to the chagrin of Earl Long, who was said to have hand-picked Spaht so that Long might still exert some influence in future government decisions. Dubbed "Earl's Boy", Spaht was the Long candidate largely by default in what became a strongly anti-Long year. Opponents of the Long ticket opposed tax increases during Earl Long's tenure and feared such increased costs of government would continue under a Spaht administration.

In the first primary on January 15, 1952, nine candidates ran. Spaht led with 173,987 votes to Kennon's 163,434 votes. In the runoff, all seven other candidates, including U.S. Representative Hale Boggs of New Orleans, endorsed Kennon. With 48 percent turnout, Kennon defeated Spaht 482,302 (61.4 percent) to 302,653 (38.6 percent).

In the April 22 general election, Kennon defeated, 96–4 percent, only the second Republican of the twentieth century to seek the state governorship, Harrison Bagwell, a Baton Rouge attorney.

Supporting Nixon/Lodge ticket

In 1960, Judge Spaht refused to endorse the Kennedy/Johnson presidential ticket, which handily secured the ten electoral votes of Louisiana, having benefited from divided opposition. Instead, Spaht gave speeches for the Nixon/Lodge Republican team. In Minden, Kennon's hometown, Spaht spoke at the invitation of the local "Democrats-for-Nixon" committee. Earl Long had endorsed the Kennedy-Johnson slate but had died two months before the general election. Spaht declared that the Kennedy record was one of "extreme socialism in matters of health, education, and taxes." Spaht said the Kennedy position on offshore tidelands was contrary to the needs of Louisiana state government. He claimed that only Nixon could "stand up" to the Soviets. "The best way to determine what a man will do is to see what he already has done," said Spaht in endorsing Nixon. Spaht's visit to Minden was arranged by the Democratic State Central Committee member and dairyman Roy D. "Don" Hinton (1912–2011), who said that his opposition to the Kennedy/Johnson ticket grew after he attended a state party meeting in Baton Rouge, where more details of the Democratic national platform were unveiled.

Civic accomplishments

Spaht was a proponent of the desegregation of the Louisiana State University Law School and later worked to end segregation elsewhere. He promoted the creation of predominantly African American Southern University campuses in Shreveport and New Orleans.

When McKeithen became governor, he named Spaht to the prestigious LSU Board of Supervisors. Spaht worked with McKeithen in 1964 in drafting a code of ethics for elected officials and state employees.

Memberships
State Commission on Alcoholism
Baton Rouge Bi-Racial Committee
Committee on Emergency Allocations
State Ethics Board
Presbyterian Church
Boy Scouts of America
Veterans of Foreign Wars
American Legion
Young Men's Christian Association
American Red Cross
Young Men's Business Club

Death and burial

Spaht died in Baton Rouge and is interred at Greenoaks Memorial Park in East Baton Rouge Parish. Spaht's son, Carlos G. Spaht, II (born June 22, 1942), who is registered with no party, is a mathematics professor at Louisiana State University in Shreveport. Another son, Paul H. Spaht (born July 1946), a Republican, practices law at his father's former Baton Rouge firm.

On April 2, 2008, Spaht, former state senator J. D. DeBlieux, and former Register of the State Lands Ellen Bryan Moore, were honored posthumously by the annual Louisiana Governor's Prayer Breakfast.

References

1906 births
2001 deaths
Politicians from Baton Rouge, Louisiana
People from Gentry County, Missouri
Louisiana state court judges
District attorneys in Louisiana
Louisiana State University alumni
United States Army colonels
United States Army personnel of World War II
American Presbyterians
Louisiana Democrats
20th-century American judges